Broome is a village and civil parish in the English county of Norfolk. It is situated on the north bank of the River Waveney, which forms the border with Suffolk, some 2 km north of the town of Bungay and 20 km south-east of the city of Norwich.

History
Broome's name is of Anglo-Saxon origin and derives from the Old English for a thorny bush or shrub.

In the Domesday Book, Brooke is described of consisting of 41 households, belonging to Bury St Edmunds Abbey.

Geography
In the 2001 Census, Broome had a population of 475 people in 190 households, reducing to 458 at the 2011 census. 
For the purposes of local government, the parish falls within the district of South Norfolk.

St. Michael's Church
Broome's Parish Church is dedicated to Saint Michael and is of Norman origin.

Places of Interest
Broome has one public house, called 'The Artichoke.'

The nearby Broome Pits are a series of four former gravel pits which now form fishing lakes in which Carp, Northern pike, Tench and Bream can be caught.

Notable Residents
 Thomas Manning- English sinologist and traveller
Joe Lewis- Aberdeen F.C. and England Under-21s goalkeeper

War Memorial
Broome's War Memorial is located in St. Michael's Churchyard and holds the following names for the First World War:
 Able-Seaman William Taylor (1887-1916), HMS Defence
 Lance-Corporal Thomas Clark (d.1917), 1st Battalion, Suffolk Regiment
 Bombardier William Pulford (d.1915), 115th (Siege) Battery, Royal Garrison Artillery
 Driver William E. Lawes (d.1917), 487th Company, Royal Army Service Corps
 Private Ernest E. Fish (1880-1918), 2nd (City of London) Battalion, London Regiment
 Private E. Charles Walker (1876-1917), 17th Battalion, Middlesex Regiment
 Private Charles C. Spalding (1892-1917), 1/5th Battalion, Royal Norfolk Regiment
 Private John P. Sparkes (1895-1917), 8th Battalion, Royal Norfolk Regiment
 Private Herbert A. M. Youngs (1896-1917), 8th Battalion, Royal Norfolk Regiment
 Private Wilfred M. Bale (1893-1916), 9th Battalion, Royal Norfolk Regiment
 Private Philip T. Cole (1892-1916), 9th Battalion, Royal Norfolk Regiment
 Private Frederick C. Walker (1895-1917), 2nd Battalion, Suffolk Regiment
 Private Frederick Harrod (1894-1917), 5th Battalion, Suffolk Regiment
 Private Arthur Smith (1889-1916), 11th Battalion, Suffolk Regiment
 Private John Howlett (d.1918), 12th Battalion, Suffolk Regiment
 Private Charles G. P. Ellis (d.1917), 9th Battalion, Royal Sussex Regiment
 Private William King (d.1918), 6th Battalion, Queen's Own (Royal West Kent Regiment)
 Deckhand Archibald H. Barker (1892-1916), H.M. Drifter Kent County

And, the following for the Second World War:
 Flight-Sergeant Henry K. Bartlett (1920-1943), Royal Air Force

References

External links

Villages in Norfolk
Civil parishes in Norfolk